The Simpsons Disney+ shorts are a series of short promotional films based on the television series The Simpsons produced for Disney+.

All of the shorts were directed by longtime Simpsons director David Silverman and produced by Gracie Films and 20th Television Animation.

 Background 
The Simpsons originated in animated shorts that aired as a recurring segment on the variety television series The Tracey Ullman Show for three seasons, before the characters spun off into The Simpsons, their own half-hour prime-time show.

Following the release of The Simpsons Movie, two theatrical shorts featuring Maggie Simpson were produced: The Longest Daycare (2012), released with Ice Age: Continental Drift, and Playdate with Destiny (2020), released with Onward.

When The Simpsons was added to Disney+, co-creator and executive producer James L. Brooks suggested the creation of a series of short films in which the Simpsons would "invade the rest of Disney+" as a way to promote The Simpsons and reach viewers who may not have been familiar with the series.

 The Force Awakens from Its Nap The Force Awakens from Its Nap was released on May 4, 2021, on Disney+ in celebration of Star Wars Day.

The Good, the Bart, and the Loki 

The Simpsons: The Good, the Bart, and the Loki is the second promotional short, after The Force Awakens from Its Nap (2021), that ties in with Disney+'s brands and titles. The Good, the Bart, and the Loki is directed by David Silverman and celebrates the Marvel Cinematic Universe, particularly its television series Loki, with Tom Hiddleston reprising his role as Loki. The short was released on July 7, 2021, on Disney+, alongside the fifth episode of Loki.

Plusaversary 

Plusaversary debuting on Disney+ for its second anniversary in 2021 and is the third promotional short produced for Disney+. The short was directed by David Silverman and released on November 12, 2021 – Disney+ Day. In the short film, there is a Disney+ party at Moe's Tavern and everyone is invited except Homer.

When Billie Met Lisa 

When Billie Met Lisa is the fourth promotional short produced for Disney+. Like the previous shorts, it was directed by David Silverman and released on April 22, 2022.

Welcome to the Club 

Welcome to the Club is the fifth Simpsons short produced for Disney+. It released in celebration of Disney+ Day on September 8th, 2022. In the short, Lisa enters a castle in order to become recognized as an official Disney Princess, only to be persuaded through song by many classic Disney villains, to become a villain instead.

Meet the Bocellis in ‘‘Feliz Navidad’’ 

Meet the Bocellis in ‘‘Feliz Navidad’’ is the sixth Simpsons short produced for Disney+. It was released on December 15, 2022. In the short, The Simpsons family celebrate Christmas, alongside Andrea Bocelli, and his family, Matteo Bocelli and Virginia Bocelli.

References 

Film series introduced in 2021
Simpsons
Simpsons
Disney+